INS Sindhushastra (S65) is a   diesel-electric submarine of the Indian Navy.

References

Sindhughosh-class submarines
Attack submarines
Ships built in Russia
1999 ships
Submarines of India